Ko Yo is an island, located in the Songkhla lake in the area of Mueang Songkhla District, Songkhla Province in southern Thailand.

Geography
Ko Yo is a small island in the middle of southern Songkhla lake, a part of Songkhla Province. Covering an area of 3,710 acres, most of the area is mountains and hills, 10-151 meters high, with the northernmost part of the island being "Khao Bo" or "Khao Khae". From Khao Bo is connected to the south called "Khao Kuti", the highest point of the area about 151 meters. 

Neighbouring places are (from north clockwise): Singhanakhon District, Mueang Songkhla District, Mueang Songkhla District, and Hat Yai District, all of them are in Songkhla Province.

Administration
Ko Yo has the status of a tambon (sub-district) in Mueang Songkhla District.

Ko Yo is administered by the Subdistrict Administrative Organization (SAO) Ko Yo (องค์การบริหารส่วนตำบลเกาะยอ).

It also consists of nine mubans (village).

Transportation

Ko Yo is approximately 20 kilometers southwest of Mueang Songkhla District Office by land and 6 kilometers by water. The island connected to the mainland by Tinsulanonda Bridge, which is divided into two phases.

Demography
Most of the local population is of Thai-Chinese people who work in fishing and cultivation.

Tourism
Ko Yo that has recently become one of important tourist attractions in province of Songkhla. It is famous for its cotton-weaving industry called "Ko Yo Woven Cloth". Parapocryptes serperaster, a species of goby can be found locally and is cooked as a local delicacy.

Local products
Ko Yo Woven Cloth
Chempedak
Crispy Barramundi Skin

References

Islands of Thailand
Tourist attractions in Songkhla province
Tambon of Songkhla Province